The Eight Great Eminent Officials, abbreviated as the Eight Elders, were a group of elderly members of the Chinese Communist Party (CCP) who held substantial power in the last two decades of the 20th century. In the English-speaking world, these men are often called The Eight Immortals as an allusion to the Taoist deities commonly known as the Eight Immortals.

Deng Xiaoping, who emerged as China's top leader in December 1978, as a result of the 3rd Plenary Session of the 11th Central Committee, was the most powerful of the group, but his power was never absolute, and he had to consult and make compromises with the other seven Elders, of whom the most prominent were Chen Yun and Li Xiannian (considered the second and third in power, respectively, and both associated with the leftist hard-liners and opposition to reform and market-oriented economy). Deng's allies among the Elders included Yang Shangkun and Peng Zhen. By the late 1980s, all Elders, including Deng himself, were united in opposition to further political reforms, while holding different views in economic and foreign affairs.

According to reformist General Secretary Zhao Ziyang, of all the Elders, Li Xiannian was the most prominent, most active and most successful in opposing and blocking changes and reforms in both political and economic issues. Important decisions were often made in Deng's home. The Eight Elders were able to remove three Party leaders. Hua Guofeng was gradually removed from Premier and Party chairman between 1980 and 1981; Hu Yaobang was removed in 1987; and, Zhao Ziyang was removed in 1989. Deng, the core of the eight Elders, retired after the 5th Plenary Session of the 13th Central Committee (November 1989), when he resigned from his last official title (Chairman of the Central Military Commission), and the rest of the Elders officially retired after the 14th Party Congress in October 1992 when the Central Advisory Commission was abolished. They still held decisive influence behind the scenes until the death of Deng happened in February 1997.

Membership 
The membership was never formally stated. With Deng Xiaoping as the main holder of power, the eight elders are accepted to include:

Timeline of the life span of members

Descendants 
Descendants of the eight Elders who have benefited significantly from nepotism and cronyism constitute a group now known as "the Princelings" or the "Crown Prince Party". Its members, rising through party ranks, can easily overrule any opposition in their jurisdictions, even if they are assigned to a local administrative position. They are often seen to outrank other party officials and possess greater prestige due to their lineage. Bloomberg has reported on the extensive wealth accumulated by these descendants via their roles in various public and private companies.

Notes

References

External links
 AsiaWeek article
 John Ruwitch 'China's leaders tug strings of power in retirement' (Reuters)

History of the People's Republic of China
Octets
Chinese Communist Party

de:Führungsgenerationen in der Volksrepublik China